Eliphalet Adams (March 26, 1677 — October 4, 1753) was an eminent minister of New London, Connecticut.  He graduated from Harvard University in 1694. He was ordained February 9, 1709, and died on October 4, 1753, aged 76. Dr. Chauncy spoke of him as a great "Hebrician".

He published a sermon on the death of Rev. James Noyes of Stonington; election sermons, 1710 and 1733; a discourse, occasioned by a distressing storm on March 3, 1717; a thanksgiving sermon in 1721 and gave a sermon on the death of Gov. Leverett Saltonstall I in 1724.

He spoke at the ordinations of William Gager, May 27, 1725 and Thomas Clap, 1726; and at a discourse before a society of young men in 1727.

References

External links
Appleton's Cyclopedia of American Biography, edited by James Grant Wilson, John Fiske and Stanley L. Klos. Six volumes, New York: D. Appleton and Company, 1887-1889 

1677 births
1753 deaths
18th-century Calvinist and Reformed ministers
18th-century New England Puritan ministers
18th-century Protestant religious leaders
American Christian clergy
American Puritans
American religious writers
Harvard Divinity School alumni
Massachusetts colonial-era clergy
Clergy from Dedham, Massachusetts
People from New London, Connecticut
Puritan ministers
People from colonial Dedham, Massachusetts